Carex novae-angliae, the New England sedge, is a Carex species that is native to North America.

Description

Carex novae-angliae is loosely tufted, with ascending to erect rhizomes.

Habitat and distribution

The plant occurs commonly in mesic deciduous forests and less commonly in evergreen-deciduous forests.

It is native to North America, but is more common in Canada and the north-eastern United States than the American Midwest or South.

Conservation status in the United States
It is listed  as threatened in  Michigan, and Minnesota, and as a species of special concern in Connecticut.

References

novae-angliae
Flora of North America